The red Tarvydas dress of Rebecca Twigley was a revealing dress worn by Australian model Rebecca Twigley (who assumed the married name Rebecca Judd in 2010), to the 2004 Brownlow Medal ceremony on 20 September 2004 at the Crown Casino and Entertainment Complex in Melbourne, Australia.  The custom-made dress was designed by Ruth Tarvydas and was valued at A$2,000.

Reception
Although Twigley's then boyfriend and future husband, Chris Judd, won the Brownlow Medal at that ceremony, much of the media attention focused on Twigley's dress. Twigley received more hits on Australian news website news.com.au than did the crowning of Miss Universe 2004, Jennifer Hawkins, surpassing all previous records for a single news day. Australian Football League CEO Andrew Demetriou described Twigley as one of the 20 highlights of the 2004 AFL season. Speaking about the dress, Twigley said: "I really didn't think it would grab that much attention, but I got hounded on the red carpet. Everyone wanted an interview and pictures." The media still refers to her dress as "that dress".

Radio presenter Jon Faine criticised Twigley's choice of fashion, saying that: "A lot of effort has gone in this season by football codes... to try to stop footballers looking at women as objects as nothing other than sexual desire or bits of meat and flesh... It's kind of like they are undoing all the work that was done earlier in the season." Faine's colleague Virginia Trioli disagreed, saying that "They are powerful, individual, attractive, strong women who want to look nice."

Aftermath
Twigley donated the dress to national children's charity TLC for Kids. The dress was auctioned off in October 2004, going for A$23,000. TLC later rejected the winning bid when it discovered the buyer had links to adult dating agency RedHotPie. The charity then offered the underbidders the dress, but later changed their mind because they could not guarantee media coverage for the purchaser. The dress was returned to Twigley, who donated it to Chris Judd's then football club, the West Coast Eagles.

Following Tarvydas's death in 2014, Rebecca Judd acknowledged the dress in her tribute to the designer on Twitter, saying "You changed my life with your red dress Ruth. RIP beautiful lady x". The dress was the final gown in the Tarvydas tribute show at the Perth Fashion Festival.

See also
List of individual dresses
White shift dress of Jean Shrimpton

References

Brownlow Medal
2000s fashion
2004 in fashion
2004 clothing
2004 Australian Football League season
Individual dresses
Red carpet fashion
Twigley